John Manoogian II is an industrial designer, adjunct faculty member, automotive industry expert and automobile designer — widely known for his nearly 33-year career with General Motors, where he designed for the company's Chevrolet, Pontiac, Saturn, Buick, Oldsmobile and Cadillac divisions.

At Cadillac, Manoogian's work spanned from the hastily conceived and oft-derided Cimarron to the second generation Cadillac CTS Coupe, winner of the Motor Trend Car of the Year, Best Concept Car Design & Best Vehicle Design award at the 2008 North American International Auto Show, as well as the production and concept categories at EyesOn Design, an event judged by noted vehicle designers.

After General Motors, Manoogian has served on the faculty at the College of Creative Studies as well as Design Director with Quadrobot Corporation, developers of a last mile, autonomous electric delivery vehicle.

Background

Manoogian was born in Detroit to Rose Violet Manoogian (1922-2018) and John Albert Manoogian (1921-2016), a former Marine in World War II — and later, manager of the Alpha Project, Ford Motor Company's advanced manufacturing program. 

Manoogian grew up in Michigan and after working as a designer/clay sculptor for Ford Motor Company, returned to school and received a B.A. in Transportation Design from the Art Center College of Design, Los Angeles— and subsequently an M.B.A. from Oakland University, Rochester, MI.

Career

After joining the General Motors Design Staff in 1976,  Manoogian acted as Assistant Chief Designer at Saturn Exterior, Pontiac Exterior, Cadillac Exterior; Chief Designer at Pontiac Exterior; Executive Vehicle Chief Designer at Buick, Chevrolet, Pontiac Exterior; and Director of Design at Cadillac Exterior.  He designed two Presidential Limousines, 2006 and 2009; and interviewed and hired college graduates for design positions at GM Design. He has served as a Sheet Metal Subject Matter Expert and holds 3 design patents.

Portfolio:
1981 Cadillac Cimarron
1996 Pontiac Grand Prix,
2004 Pontiac Grand Prix
2005 Cadillac DTS
2006 Buick Lucerne
Chevrolet Impala
2008 Cadillac CTS
2006 and 2009 USA Presidential Limousines

Manoogian formed a design consultancy, Forzablitz,  and has acted as an automotive design patent expert witness. He taught for seven years at the College of Creative Studies. As an industry speaker, he has addressed the Industrial Designer's Society of America Annual Michigan conference on Transportation and the Portland Art Museum and has participated with numerous car clubs; appeared in the documentary "Detroit in Overdrive;" and acted as a design judge at the La Jolla,CA, Meadowbrook Concours, EyesOn Design Automotive Design Exhibition.

In 2020, Manoogian served as Director of Design for Quadrobot Corporation, founded in 2017 by Mike Tianye Wang, a former student of Manoogian.  The company is developing an autonomous, electric last mile delivery vehicle.

See also
 Manoogian Sketch Book

References

General Motors people
Ford people
Automobile designers
General Motors designers
American automobile designers
Automotive businesspeople
1947 births
Living people